Kurnayevka is a rural locality (a selo) and the administrative center of Kurbayevskoye Rural Settlement, Staropoltavsky District, Volgograd Oblast, Russia. The population was 666 as of 2010. There are 18 streets.

Geography 
Kurnayevka is located in steppe, on the bank of the Volga River, 55 km southwest of Staraya Poltavka (the district's administrative centre) by road. Kolyshkino is the nearest rural locality.

References 

Rural localities in Staropoltavsky District